Bill Tallon (9 July 1914 – 18 September 1972) was an Australian cricketer. He played in nine first-class matches for Queensland between 1938 and 1940.

See also
 List of Queensland first-class cricketers

References

External links
 

1914 births
1972 deaths
Australian cricketers
Queensland cricketers
Cricketers from Queensland
Sportspeople from Bundaberg
Sportsmen from Queensland